Dilatotarsa is a genus of beetles in the family Cicindelidae, containing the following species:

 Dilatotarsa beccarii (Gestro, 1879)
 Dilatotarsa cassolai Werner & Sawada, 1990
 Dilatotarsa kinabaluensis (Mandl, 1969)
 Dilatotarsa loeffleri (Mandl, 1969)
 Dilatotarsa patricia (Schaum, 1970)
 Dilatotarsa philippinensis (Mandl, 1970)
 Dilatotarsa robinsoni Cassola & Murray, 1979
 Dilatotarsa tricondyloides (Gestro, 1874)

References

Cicindelidae